Wheeland is a town on Providenciales, Turks and Caicos Islands. As of 2012 it had a population of 3,210.

Wheeland is located between Blue Hills and Northwest Point. There are two residential neighborhoods in the area: Millennium Heights and Wheeland Settlement. The Wheeland Pond is the site of a former sand quarry. Traditionally the main industries in Wheeland were lumber harvesting and ship salvaging.

References

External links
Mangrove Planting in Wheeland

Populated places in the Turks and Caicos Islands